Harold Rowe Holbrook Jr. (February 17, 1925 – January 23, 2021) was an American actor, television director, and screenwriter. He first received critical acclaim in 1954 for a one-man stage show that he developed called Mark Twain Tonight! while studying at Denison University. He won the Tony Award for Best Actor in a Play in 1966 for his portrayal of Twain. He continued to perform his signature role for over 60 years, only retiring the show in 2017 due to his failing health. Throughout his career, he also won five Primetime Emmy Awards for his work on television and was nominated for an Academy Award for his work in film.

Holbrook made his film debut in Sidney Lumet's The Group (1966). He later gained international fame for his performance as Deep Throat in the 1976 film All the President's Men. He played Abraham Lincoln in the 1973  miniseries Lincoln and 1985  miniseries North and South. He also appeared in such films as Julia and Capricorn One (1977), The Fog (1980), Creepshow (1982), Wall Street (1987), The Firm (1993), Hercules (1997), and Men of Honor (2000).

Holbrook's role as Ron Franz in Sean Penn's Into the Wild (2007) earned him both an Academy Award and a Screen Actors Guild Award nomination for Best Supporting Actor. In 2009, he received critical acclaim for his performance as recently retired farmer Abner Meecham in the independent film That Evening Sun. He also portrayed Francis Preston Blair in Steven Spielberg's Lincoln (2012).

In 2003, Holbrook was honored with the National Humanities Medal by President George W. Bush.

Early life
Harold Rowe Holbrook Jr. was born on February 17, 1925, in Cleveland, Ohio, the son of Aileen (née Davenport) Holbrook (1905–1987), a vaudeville dancer, and Harold Rowe Holbrook Sr. (1902–1982).

Holbrook and his two older sisters were abandoned by their parents when he was two years old. The three children were raised by their paternal grandparents, first in Weymouth, Massachusetts, and later in the Cleveland suburb of Lakewood, Ohio. He graduated from Culver Military Academy (now part of the Culver Academies) and then from Denison University, where an honors project about Mark Twain led him to develop the one-man show for which he was best known, a series of performances called Mark Twain Tonight!. He also studied acting at HB Studio in New York City.

From 1942 through 1946, Holbrook served in the United States Army in World War II, achieving the rank of staff sergeant; he was stationed in Newfoundland, where he performed in theater productions such as the play Lady Precious Stream.

Career

Mark Twain Tonight!

Holbrook's first solo performance as Twain was at Lock Haven State Teachers College in Pennsylvania in 1954.  Ed Sullivan saw him and gave 31-year-old Holbrook his first national exposure on The Ed Sullivan Show on February 12, 1956. Holbrook was also a member of the Valley Players (1941–1962), a summer-stock theater company based in Holyoke, Massachusetts, which performed at Mountain Park Casino Playhouse at Mountain Park. He joined The Lambs Club in 1955, where he began developing his one-man show. He was a member of the cast for several years and performed Mark Twain Tonight! as the 1957 season opener. The State Department even sent him on a European tour, which included pioneering appearances behind the Iron Curtain.

In 1959, Holbrook first played the role off-Broadway. Columbia Records recorded an LP of excerpts from the show.

Holbrook performed in a special production for the 1964/1965 New York World's Fair for the Bell Telephone Pavilion.  Jo Mielziner created an innovative audio-visual ride experience and used Holbrook's acting talents on 65 different action screens for "The Ride of Communications" with the movie itself known as From Drumbeats to Telstar.

In 1967, Mark Twain Tonight! was presented on television by CBS and Xerox, and Holbrook received an Emmy for his performance. Holbrook's Twain first played on Broadway in 1966, and again in 1977 and 2005; Holbrook was 80 years old during his final Broadway run, older (for the first time) than the character he was portraying. Holbrook won a Tony Award for the performance in 1966. Until Holbrook retired in 2017, aged 92, Mark Twain Tonight! toured the country, which amounted to over 2,100 performances. This included one of his first performances in the spring of 1962 and one of his last in September 2014, at his high-school alma mater in Indiana.

Success
In 1964, Holbrook played the role of the Major in the original production of Arthur Miller's Incident at Vichy. In 1968, he was one of the replacements for Richard Kiley in the original Broadway production of Man of La Mancha, although he had limited singing ability. In 1966, Holbrook starred opposite Shirley Booth in the acclaimed CBS Playhouse production of The Glass Menagerie.

Holbrook co-starred with Martin Sheen in the controversial and acclaimed 1972 television film That Certain Summer. Around that same year, Holbrook appeared in a television public service announcement (PSA) commissioned by the Ad Council; aimed at the parents of college students planning to study abroad, the PSA sees Holbrook in a jail cell, warning viewers to inform their children of the penalties for drug abuse in countries outside the US. In 1973, Holbrook appeared as Lieutenant Neil Briggs, the boss and rival of Detective "Dirty" Harry Callahan (Clint Eastwood) in Magnum Force, an "obsessively neat and prim fanatic" who supports the obliteration of San Francisco's criminals and who is the leader of a rogue group of vigilante officers.

In 1976, Holbrook won acclaim for his portrayal of Abraham Lincoln in a series of television specials based on Carl Sandburg's acclaimed biography. He won a Primetime Emmy Award for Outstanding Lead Actor in a Drama Series for the 1970 series The Bold Ones: The Senator. He was also famous for his role as the enigmatic Deep Throat (whose identity was unknown at the time) in the film All the President's Men. In 1979, he starred with Katharine Ross, Barry Bostwick, and Richard Anderson in the made-for-TV movie Murder by Natural Causes. He appeared in other various mini-series, including George Washington (1984) and Dress Gray (1986), and continued performing in theatrical productions, such as King Lear.  Holbrook was the narrator on the Ken Burns documentary Lewis & Clark: The Journey of the Corps of Discovery in 1997.

From 1986 to 1989, Holbrook had a recurring role as Reese Watson on Designing Women, opposite his wife Dixie Carter. Over a short period between 1988 and 1990, Holbrook directed four episodes of the series. Holbrook also had a major role on the sitcom Evening Shade throughout its entire run.
Early on in his career, Holbrook worked onstage and in a television soap opera, The Brighter Day.

In 1999, Holbrook was inducted into the American Theatre Hall of Fame. A year later, Holbrook appeared in Men of Honor, where he portrayed a racist and hypocritical officer who endlessly tries to fail an African-American diver trainee. Holbrook played the role of Albie Duncan in two episodes of The West Wing.

He appeared as the host in the documentary The Seventh Day: Revelations From The Lost Pages of History (2005).

Later career
He appeared in Sean Penn's critically acclaimed film Into the Wild (2007) and received an Oscar nomination for Best Performance by an Actor in a Supporting Role at the 80th Academy Awards. At the time, this rendered Holbrook, at age 82, the oldest nominee in Academy Award history in the Best Supporting Actor category. Holbrook was nominated for a Screen Actors Guild Award for his work in the film. From late August through mid-September 2007, he starred as the narrator in the Hartford Stage production of Thornton Wilder's Our Town, a role he had once played on television.

Holbrook appeared with wife Dixie Carter in That Evening Sun, filmed in East Tennessee in the summer of 2008. The film, produced by Dogwood Entertainment, is based on a short story by William Gay. That Evening Sun premiered in March 2009 at South By Southwest, where it received the Audience Award for Narrative Feature and a special Jury Prize for Ensemble Cast. Joe Leydon of Variety hailed Hollbrook's performance in the film as a "career-highlight star turn as an irascible octogenarian farmer who will not go gentle into that good night". That Evening Sun also was screened at the 2009 Nashville Film Festival, where Holbrook was honored with a special Lifetime Achievement Award, and the film itself received another Audience Award.

Holbrook appeared as a featured guest star in a 2006 episode of the HBO series The Sopranos and the NCIS episode "Escaped". On April 22, 2010, Holbrook signed on to portray Katey Sagal's character's father on the FX original series Sons of Anarchy for a four-episode arc in their third season, as well as appearing in additional fifth episode in the final season. He also had a multiple-episode arc on The Event, an American television series on NBC, appearing in the 2010–2011 season.

In 2011, Holbrook appeared in Water for Elephants. In 2012, Steven Spielberg cast Holbrook to play Francis Preston Blair in Lincoln. His film roles were in Gus Van Sant's Promised Land (2012), the animated film Planes: Fire & Rescue (2014), and in the minor role as Whizzer in the drama film Blackway (2016). In 2014, Holbrook was the subject of Scott Teems' documentary Holbrook/Twain: An American Odyssey depicting Holbrook's long-lasting career portraying Twain. It was premiered at the Los Angeles Film Festival that same year.

In 2016, Holbrook was cast as Red Hudmore and appeared in the final season of Bones on January 17, 2017. On March 23, 2017, he appeared on an episode on Grey's Anatomy playing a retired thoracic surgeon whose wife is a patient, and on Hawaii Five-0 later in the year.

In September 2017, after six decades of playing the role of Mark Twain, Holbrook announced his retirement from Mark Twain Tonight! Holbrook indicated that he would like to continue working on movies and television.

Personal life
Holbrook was married three times and had three children. He married a Newfoundlander, Ruby Elaine Johnston, in 1945 and they had two children. They divorced in 1965. In 1966, he married Carol Eve Rossen. They had one child and they divorced in 1983.

Holbrook married actress and singer Dixie Carter in 1984 and the couple remained married until Carter's death from endometrial cancer on April 10, 2010. Holbrook appeared as a recurring character on Carter's TV series, Designing Women.

Holbrook said of his home in McLemoresville, Tennessee, that it had the "feel" of the Mark Twain House in Hartford, Connecticut, and that there was no other place to which he felt so ideally suited. He also had a residence in Beverly Hills, California. Holbrook had a recurring role on his wife's hit sitcom Designing Women, appearing in nine episodes between 1986 and 1989 as Carter's on-screen significant other. In 2011, Holbrook's memoir, Harold: The Boy Who Became Mark Twain, was published by Farrar, Straus and Giroux.

In October 2016, Holbrook wrote a letter to The New York Times defending actor director Nate Parker over his alleged 1999 rape of a woman and Parker's controversial film The Birth of a Nation. He urged others to "move on" from Parker's past and to view the film, which was "an exceptional piece of artistry and a vital portrait of our American experience".

Political views
Holbrook occasionally criticized the politicization of religion. He was a registered independent, but leaned towards the liberal end of the U.S. political spectrum. He criticized the Republican Party while Barack Obama was in office.

In 2016, he castigated then-Republican candidate Donald Trump for not having "the maturity to run the country". Holbrook praised Senator Bernie Sanders as the only politician who does not "say what they think might get them elected" and praised his honesty.

Death
Holbrook died at his home in Beverly Hills on January 23, 2021, at age 95; no cause was given. His death was announced more than a week later, on February 2. He was buried in McLemoresville Cemetery in McLemoresville, Tennessee, alongside his wife, Dixie Carter.

Legacy
In 2003, President George W. Bush honored Holbrook with a National Humanities Medal for "charming audiences with the wit and wisdom of Mark Twain as Twain's outlook never fails to give Holbrook a good show to put on".

The local community of McLemoresville, hometown of his wife Dixie Carter, constructed the Dixie Theatre for Performing Arts in nearby Huntingdon, Tennessee, which features the Hal Holbrook Auditorium. Upon his retirement from his Mark Twain persona, the HuffPost hailed Holbrook as "the man who has done more to keep Mark Twain on people's minds than anyone else".

Filmography

Awards and nominations

References

Further reading

External links

 
 
 
 
 Hal Holbrook Papers at the Wisconsin Center for Film and Theater Research
 
 
 

1925 births
2021 deaths
20th-century American male actors
20th-century American male writers
21st-century American male actors
21st-century American male writers
American impressionists (entertainers)
American male film actors
American male stage actors
American male television actors
American male voice actors
American television directors
Audiobook narrators
Burials in Tennessee
Culver Academies alumni
Denison University alumni
Male actors from Cleveland
National Humanities Medal recipients
Outstanding Performance by a Lead Actor in a Drama Series Primetime Emmy Award winners
Outstanding Performance by a Lead Actor in a Miniseries or Movie Primetime Emmy Award winners
People from Lakewood, Ohio
People from Weymouth, Massachusetts
Tony Award winners
United States Army personnel of World War II
United States Army non-commissioned officers
Writers from Massachusetts
Writers from Cleveland